Xiaolongnü is the fictional female protagonist of the wuxia novel The Return of the Condor Heroes by Jin Yong. In the novel, her physical appearances is described as follows: "skin as white as snow, beautiful and elegant beyond convention and cannot be underestimated, but appears cold and indifferent". She trains the protagonist Yang Guo in martial arts, and they eventually fall in love.

Name
In the novel, the guardians of Xiaolongnü (literally "Little Dragon Maiden") name her after the Chinese zodiac year in which she was born, the Year of the Dragon. Yang Guo, Granny Sun, and her martial arts master call her "Long'er", but otherwise, the novel gives her no other name.

Fictional character biography

Early life
An unknown figure abandons an infant Xiaolongnü outside Chongyang Palace (the Quanzhen School's headquarters). Her cries pierce the silence of the night and draw the attention of the Quanzhen priests. Before they decide what to do with the baby girl because the school does not accept female members, a middle-aged woman called Granny Sun appears and takes Xiaolongnü away to the nearby Ancient Tomb.

An unnamed apprentice of Lin Chaoying, the founder of the Ancient Tomb School, raises Xiaolongnü. As a child, she learns all the school's martial arts and masters all of them after many years. She starts learning the school's highest order skill from the Jade Maiden Heart Sutra, but since her master's understanding of the skill is incomplete, her own understanding is even more limited.

The school expels Xiaolongnü's senior, Li Mochou, for poor conduct. Xiaolongnü inherits the school's leadership position at age 14 after her master dies. Only Granny Sun accompanies her. Meanwhile, Li Mochou spreads rumours in the jianghu that when Xiaolongnü turns 16, she will offer her hand in marriage to any man who can defeat her. The lucky man will also claim possession of the tomb, which is said to house great treasures and martial arts manuals. The Mongol prince Huodu believes the tale and travels to the Ancient Tomb, hoping to meet Xiaolongnü. He brings his henchmen with him, and they raid Chongyang Palace along the way. Coincidentally, Guo Jing arrives at Chongyang Palace with Yang Guo and drives away Huodu and his men.

As Yang Guo's teacher and lover
Xiaolongnü meets Yang Guo for the first time when he ventures into the Ancient Tomb while escaping from the bullies at Quanzhen School. She asks Granny Sun to send him back to Quanzhen and tell the priests not to mistreat him anymore. However, the Quanzhen priests insult Yang when they see him return. The furious Granny Sun fights them, but Hao Datong mortally wounds her. Xiaolongnü appears at the critical moment, defeats Hao Datong and saves Yang Guo. Before her death, Granny Sun makes Xiaolongnü promise to take care of Yang Guo. She wants both of them, orphans, to have each other as companions after her death. The Quanzhen priests oblige and allow Yang Guo to leave with Xiaolongnü.

Xiaolongnü accepts Yang Guo as her apprentice, and they live together in the Ancient Tomb for several years. During these years, Xiaolongnü imparts most of her martial arts and skills to Yang Guo. Yang Guo does not like to address her as "Master" (sifu) and prefers to call her "Aunt" instead as an honorific without blood relation. They fall in love, but the prevailing norms of the wulin (martial artists' community) makes their romance taboo due to master-apprentice relationship. They encounter several tribulations after leaving the tomb and numerous tests of their love. Although they eventually marry in Chongyang Palace, they again separate, this time for sixteen years, until their reunion at the end of the novel.

Martial arts and skills

 Jade Maiden Heart Sutra
 Swordplay of Jade Maiden
 Fist of Beauties
 Palm of Infinity Web
 Ancient Tomb School qinggong
 Technique of Ambidexterity
 Nine Yin Manual skills

Equipment
 White-silver gloves: a pair of gloves made from white-silver that sharp weapons cannot penetrate, and with which Xiaolongnü can grab and break weapons.
 Long sash of gold bells: Xiaolongnü's weapon. She manipulates this long and flexible weapon for both long and short distance attacks. Two gold bells are tied at each end of the sash and hidden in the sleeves. Xiaolongnü flaps the sleeves to unsheathe them. The rhythmic and random ringing of the bells distracts while she uses the bells to attack the enemy's exposed acupuncture points and stun them.
 Gold needles of jade bee: This dart throwing technique is one of the fundamental skills of the Ancient Tomb School. The poison of a rare breed of bee, the jade bee, is carefully coated onto needles made from heavy gold and steel. Xiaolongnü throws the needles like darts. The degree of poison is higher than Li Mochou's Soul Freezing Needles as the venom causes excruciating pain and eventual death after a long time. The only cure to the poison is the Jade Bee's honey, which has health benefits too.
 Jade bees: The jade bees are Xiaolongnü's only "living" weapon. This special breed of bees can make formations and attack enemies when instructed by playing a musical instrument, rhythmic whistles and honey. Xiaolongnü plays the guqin to instruct the bees, and she also carries with her a bottle of honey.

In film and television
Notable actresses who have portrayed Xiaolongnü in films and television series include Nam Hung (1960–1961), Mary Jean Reimer (1983), Idy Chan (1983), Angela Pan (1984), Carman Lee (1995), Fann Wong (1998), Jacklyn Wu (1998), Liu Yifei (2006) and Michelle Chen (2014). Yuen Qiu also plays a version of the character in Kung Fu Hustle.

References

Additional sources
 Tan, Xianmao (2005). Xiaolongnü: The Fairy-like and Profound Image of Being Noble and Unsullied.  In Rankings of Jin Yong's Characters. Chinese Agricultural Press.

Fictional characters from Shandong
Fictional female martial artists
Fictional Han people
Fictional Song dynasty people
Fictional women soldiers and warriors
Jin Yong characters
Literary characters introduced in 1959
Orphan characters in literature
The Return of the Condor Heroes